Andre Begemann and Dustin Brown were the defending champions but only Begemann chose to defend his title, partnering Florin Mergea.

Begemann successfully defended his title, defeating Fabrício Neis and Pedro Sousa 5–7, 7–5, [14–12] in the final.

Seeds

Draw

References

External links
 Main draw

Città di Como Challenger - Doubles
2019 Doubles